Sheikh Hamdan bin Zayed bin Khalifa Al Nahyan was the Ruler of Abu Dhabi, one of the Trucial States which today form the United Arab Emirates (UAE), from 1912–1922.

Biography 
Hamdan was the fifth son of Zayed I, Emir of Abu Dhabi. Zayed I had many sons (at least seven) by several wives. His eldest son, Khalifa, declined the succession; it is said that Khalifa's mother compelled a promise out of him to this effect, fearing that his early death would be the inevitable consequence. This was at a time when Abu Dhabi was a fishing village. Since Khalifa declined to accept leadership, his next brother, Tahnoun, was selected. Tahnoun ruled for three years (1909–12) and died peacefully at age 55. Tahnoun had no sons. When he died, his brother Hamdan (Zayed's fifth son) seized the rulership, superseding two older brothers, apart from Khalifa.

Hamdan's rule was unpopular both within and outside the family for several reasons. Firstly, he discontinued the subsidies normally paid to family members, which added to the friction generated by the way he had seized power. He may have done this in order to concentrate the power of patronage in his own hands and ensure that other family branches do not have the resources to act against him. Secondly, while Abu Dhabi's population was violently anti-Wahhabi (a number of incursions into Buraimi had helped to cement Wahhabi unpopularity), Hamdan sent a mission to Ibn Saud in Riyadh, possibly in a bid to bolster his rule by gaining external allies. Thirdly, he is also said to have disrupted Abu Dhabi's long-standing trade relations.

Hamdan's reign witnessed the breakdown of authority which had been entrenched during his powerful father's long reign. In Liwa and Buraimi, fighting broke out between the Bedouin tribes, with the Manasir and Bani Yas fighting a southern confederation of Awamir, Duru and Al Bu Shamis. Himself becoming an ally of the Wahhabis, Hamdan managed to broker an uneasy truce.

Assassination and aftermath
In August 1922, after ruling for ten years, Hamdan was killed by his younger brother, Sultan, who seized the throne. This murder only added to disorder within the family and the town. Several family members, including Hamdan's daughters, fled to Dubai (one of them would marry a future ruler of Dubai and become the mother of the present ruler). Two other brothers of Hamdan and Sultan began a campaign against Sultan. Intrigue and strife were rife as factions emerged in the confusion following the murder. There were other difficulties also: Sultan inherited the unstable interior that Hamdan had barely pacified, pitching him into a series of wars and outbreaks of peace which dogged his rule.

In 1926, four years after he seized power, Sultan was killed by an older half-brother, Saqr, who then seized the throne. Saqr was the fourth son of Zayed and one of the brothers who Hamdan had superseded. Nor did it end here. Saqr himself was killed in 1928, within two years of usurping power. Many members of the family may have been involved in the plot to kill Saqr, including the eldest brother, Khalifa, who nevertheless held fast to his promise not to sit on the throne. The actual murder was carried out by members of the Manasir tribe.

It was Shakhbut, eldest son of Hamdan's assassin Sultan, who finally became ruler in 1928. Shakhbut (born in 1905) would rule Abu Dhabi from 1928 to 1966 and would be succeeded by his full brother, Zayed, who would rule from 1966 to 2004.

Personal life
Hamdan married twice. One of his spouses was Shamsa bint Obaid bin Mujrin Al Falasi from Dubai. They had a daughter named Latifa and a son named Hamdan who was born after his death. He was also married to Shamsa Al Suwaidi, with whom he had a daughter, named Maryam. Latifa was taken to Dubai with her mother when her father was killed. Latifa, later married Rashid bin Saeed Al Maktoum. She is the mother of the rulers of Dubai, Maktoum bin Rashid Al Maktoum and Mohammed bin Rashid Al Maktoum. Hamdan's other daughter, Maryam was married to Hazza bin Sultan Al Nahyan until his death in 1958. Sheikha Maryam died in November 2020.

References 

Sheikhs of Abu Dhabi
House of Al Nahyan
History of the United Arab Emirates
20th-century Arabs